10 Items or Less is an American comedy series created by Nancy Hower, Robert Hickey, and John Lehr. Partly scripted and partly improvised, the show starred Lehr as a less-than-successful businessman who returned home to run Greens & Grains, the family-owned supermarket, upon the death of his father.

The series debuted on TBS on November 27, 2006. During its first season, it aired Monday nights at 11 p.m. ET/PT. The second and third seasons aired on Tuesday nights at 11 p.m. ET/PT. In November 2009, a blog posting stated the show had been cancelled and would not be picked up for the fourth season.

In 2015, the series was made available on Crackle.

Summary
The series stars John Lehr as a failed New York City businessman who moves back to his hometown of Dayton, Ohio to take over the family supermarket following the death of his father. The show is set in the fictional supermarket known as Greens & Grains, located at 5th Street and Tiberius.

Characters
 Leslie Pool (John Lehr) – the owner and manager of Greens & Grains. Leslie brings his oblivious yet lovable management style to the Greens & Grains grocery store he inherits after his father's death.
 Amy Anderson (Jennifer Elise Cox) – The first and second season manager of Super Value Mart, the G&G's number one competitor from across the street. Amy went to high school with Leslie.
 Mercy P. Jones (Kim Coles) – The third season manager of Super Value Mart. She is ultra-competitive, and trying to put the G&G's out-of-business at all cost.
 Ingrid Wakowski (Kirsten Gronfield) – Ingrid is the quirky, soft-spoken customer service representative who lives for Renaissance festivals.
 Yolanda Nelson (Roberta Valderrama) – The straight talking dominant force behind the produce department.
 Todd Sykes (Chris Payne Gilbert) – Todd, the butcher who hopes to be a NASCAR driver.
 Carl Dawson (Bob Clendenin) – Carl is the sweet doofus stockboy with a huge crush on Yolanda.
 Richard Mednick (Christopher Liam Moore) – Richard is a dignified cashier who dreams of becoming a professional figure skater.
 Buchwald "Buck" Washington (Greg Davis Jr.) – Buck is a checkout bagger who is looking towards the future of becoming a doctor by attending night school.

Production
A detailed script was written for each episode outlining the overall story arc.  However, the script was not shown to the actors; instead they were provided with a loose outline of the plot, often finding out about it as they filmed.  All dialogue in the show is improvised spontaneously by the actors on the set.  A typical 22-minute episode was edited-down from roughly 30 hours of raw improvised dialogue and scenes.  John Lehr has described their production style as "similar to Spinal Tap." At one point during the first season the actors demanded to see the script, but upon receiving it they decided as a group that they did not want to see the scripts again in the future.

The series is filmed in a real grocery store called "Jon's" in Reseda, California (formerly Vons), often with actual customers used as extras.

Episodes

Season 1 (2006)

Season 2 (2008)

Season 3 (2009)

Home media

References

External links
 Official website Archive.org of 10itemsorlesstv site
 Official website Archive.org of TBS site
 Official website Archive.org of Greens 'n' Grains grocery store site
 

2006 American television series debuts
2009 American television series endings
2000s American mockumentary television series
2000s American single-camera sitcoms
2000s American workplace comedy television series
English-language television shows
TBS (American TV channel) original programming
Television series by Sony Pictures Television
Television shows set in Montgomery County, Ohio
Television shows filmed in Los Angeles
Television series set in shops